Thokur (Thokuru or Thokooru in Tulu) is a locality of Mangalore city in Karnataka State in India.

External links 
Subramanya temple at Thokoor

References 

Villages in Dakshina Kannada district